The first USS New Haven was a gundalow built in 1776 on Lake Champlain, Capt. Mansfield in command, under General Benedict Arnold, who was a native of the ship's namesake city.  New Haven took part in the engagement with the British Squadron at the Battle of Valcour Island on 11 and 12 October 1776.  The New Haven was among those vessels deliberately grounded and burned preceding the American retreat overland to Crown Point and Fort Ticonderoga.

References

External links

 

Row galleys of the Continental Navy
Age of Sail naval ships of the United States
New Haven
Maritime incidents in 1776
1776 ships